Children of Divorce is a 1927 American silent romantic drama film directed by Frank Lloyd and starring Clara Bow, Esther Ralston, and Gary Cooper. Adapted from the 1927 novel of the same name by Owen Johnson, and written by Louis D. Lighton, Hope Loring, Alfred Hustwick, and Adela Rogers St. Johns, the film is about a young flapper who tricks her wealthy friend into marrying her during a night of drunken revelry. Even though she knows that he is in love with another woman, she refuses to grant him a divorce and repeat the mistake of her divorced parents. Produced by Jesse L. Lasky, E. Lloyd Sheldon, and Adolph Zukor for the Famous Players-Lasky, the film was released on April 25, 1927 by Paramount Pictures.

Plot

Jean Waddington (Esther Ralston) and Ted Larrabee (Gary Cooper) grew up together in an affluent society, the children of divorced parents. Most of their friends have cynical attitudes towards love and marriage, but Jean and Ted are more serious. In fact, Jean has fallen in love with Ted, who one day proposes marriage. Knowing, however, that Ted's father was unfaithful to his wife and irresponsible, Jean demands that he prove himself before she accepts his proposal. Soon Ted starts a business and opens up an office in the building where their mutual friend Kitty Flanders (Clara Bow) works. Kitty is also a child of divorce.

One evening, Kitty throws a wild party at work, and Ted takes part in the revelry. At the party, Kitty meets Prince Ludovico de Saxe (Einar Hanson) and is immediately attracted to him. The prince returns her affection, but the prince's guardian Duke Henri de Goncourt (Norman Trevor) prevents them from seeing each other because she is not of their social class. Raised by a mother who insisted that she marry a wealthy man, Kitty soon sets her sights on Ted—even though she knows that Ted and her close friend Jean love each other. One evening, after going on a drunken spree, Kitty tricks Ted into marrying her, even though she does not love him.

Desperately unhappy, Ted assures Jean that he will seek a divorce as soon as possible. Not wanting him to repeat the mistakes of their parents, Jean refuses to marry him if he divorces, and sails off for Europe. The arrival of their baby does little for their marriage, and Ted avoids spending any time with his unwanted wife. Sometime later, Kitty and Ted and their child visit the prince, whom Kitty once loved. Kitty remembers her feelings for the prince and dreams of marrying him someday. When she learns that he can never marry a divorced woman for religious reasons, she poisons herself.

Cast
 Clara Bow as Kitty Flanders
 Esther Ralston as Jean Waddington
 Gary Cooper as Edward D. 'Ted' Larrabee
 Einar Hanson as Prince Ludovico de Saxe
 Norman Trevor as Duke Henri de Goncourt
 Hedda Hopper as Katherine Flanders
 Edward Martindel as Tom Larrabee
 Julia Swayne Gordon as Princess de Saxe
 Tom Ricketts as The Secretary
 Albert Gran as Mr. Seymour
 Iris Stuart as Mousie
 Margaret Campbell as Mother Superior
 Percy Williams as Manning
 Joyce Coad as Little Kitty
 Yvonne Pelletier as Little Jean

References
Notes

Bibliography

External links
 
 
 

1927 films
1927 romantic drama films
American romantic drama films
American silent feature films
American black-and-white films
Famous Players-Lasky films
Films about divorce
Films based on American novels
Films directed by Frank Lloyd
Films shot in California
Paramount Pictures films
1920s American films
Silent romantic drama films
Silent American drama films